Rodolfo Vilchis Cruz (born 15 September 1989) is a Mexican professional footballer. He is popularly known by his nickname "Pipila".

Biography

Vilchis began his career in the youth ranks of Monarcas Morelia in 2008. He spent most of his time with the team on loan to second division teams, helping Neza to the Championship in 2012–2013. He returned to the First Division with Querétaro F.C. for the Clausura 2014, and moved to Atlas for the Apertura 2014.

Club career

Querétaro

Vilchis played with Querétaro during the Clausura 2014, appearing in fifteen games with the team. He scored in his first appearance with the team against UNAM on January 10, 2014.

Atlas

The Mexican club signed Vilchis on June 5, 2014. Vilchis fractured his fifth metatarsus on July 21 and was ruled out of the next eight games of the Apertura 2014.

References

External links
 
 

1989 births
Living people
Liga MX players
Ascenso MX players
Querétaro F.C. footballers
Atlético Morelia players
Atlas F.C. footballers
Leones Negros UdeG footballers
Venados F.C. players
Potros UAEM footballers
Toros Neza footballers
Correcaminos UAT footballers
Mexican footballers
Footballers from Michoacán
People from Zitácuaro
Association football midfielders